Putianxi station may refer to:
Putianxi station (Zhengzhou Metro), a station on Line 3 (Zhengzhou Metro).
Putian West railway station, officially translated as "Putianxi railway station", a station on Longhai railway.